Samuel Talbot Logan Jr. (born October 26, 1943) is an American ecclesiastical historian and Presbyterian minister. He is professor of Church history at Biblical Theological Seminary and former president of Westminster Theological Seminary. He served as president from 1991 to 2005. He is an ordained minister in the Orthodox Presbyterian Church. Logan's tenure was abruptly terminated in 2005 by the seminary's board of trustees due to their perception that he was too inclusive of liberal scholarship.

Works

Thesis

Books

Chapters

Articles

References

1943 births
20th-century Presbyterian ministers
American historians of religion
Heads of universities and colleges in the United States
Historians of Christianity
Living people
Orthodox Presbyterian Church ministers
Presidents of Calvinist and Reformed seminaries
20th-century American clergy